Susana Gladis Vilca Achata (born August 11, 1959) is a Peruvian politician and was a Congresswoman representing Puno for the 2006–2011 term. Vilca belonged to the Union for Peru party.

Susana Gladis Vilca Achata is a mining engineer with a master's degree in Environmental Protection Technologies. She also has studies completed in the master's degree in Mining Management developed at Gerens Escuela de Postgrado.

She was elected Congresswoman of the Republic for the period 2006–2011, she also held the position of Vice Minister of Mines of the Ministry of Energy and Mines between the years 2011 and 2012, and was president of the board of directors of the Geological, Mining and Metallurgical Institute (Ingemmet) between the years 2012 and 2016.

She was also appointed Doctor Honoris Causa by the Universidad Nacional del Altiplano and has served as vice-president of the Asociación de Servicios de Geología y Minería Iberoamericanos – ASGMI.

Family 
She is the daughter of Don José Vilca and Doña Clotilde Achata. She is the eldest of six children. She did her primary studies at School No. 1124 in the District of Cabanillas and her secondary studies at the Adventist School of Chullunquiani in the city of Juliaca.

Later, she entered the Faculty of Mining Engineering at the National University of the Altiplano in Puno. She graduates as a Mining Engineer with the thesis "Technical Economic Study for the Exploitation of Alluvial Gold", research developed in the Norma Mine in the province of Sandía in Puno.

Career 

 Vice President of the Association of Ibero-American Geological and Mining Services (ASGMI) (2016)
 President of the Geological, Mining and Metallurgical Institute-INGEMMET (January 2012 – Set 2016)
 Vice Minister of Mines of the Peruvian Government (August 2011 – January 2012)
 Coordinator of the Transfer Process of the Ministry of Transport and Communications (June 2011 – July 2011)
 Member of the Permanent Commission of the Congress of the Republic (August 2010 – July 2011)
 Vice President of the Energy and Mines Commission of the Peruvian Congress (August 2010 – July 2011)
 Coordinator of the Puno Parliamentary Group (August 2009 – July 2010)
 Member of the Permanent Commission of the Congress of the Republic (August 2009 – July 2010)
 President of the Transport and Communications Commission of the Peruvian Congress (August 2007 – July 2008)
 Vice President of the Energy and Mines Commission of the Peruvian Congress (August 2006 – July 2007)
 Regional Coordinator in Puno of the Peruvian Nationalist Party.

References

External links
Official Congressional Site

Living people
1959 births
Peruvian Ministers of Energy and Mines
Members of the Congress of the Republic of Peru
Union for Peru politicians
Women government ministers of Peru
Mining engineers
Popular Action (Peru) politicians
Peruvian Nationalist Party politicians
Universidad Nacional del Altiplano de Puno alumni
Women members of the Congress of the Republic of Peru